The Crime of Monsieur Lange (French: Le Crime de Monsieur Lange) is a 1936 film directed by Jean Renoir about a publishing cooperative. Imbued with the spirit of the communist/socialist Popular Front, which would score a major political victory in 1936, the film is an idyllic picture of a socialist France and is both a social commentary and a romance.

Plot
M. Lange is a mild-mannered writer of Western stories for a publishing company. Batala, the salacious owner of the company, flees his creditors. When his train crashes, he takes the opportunity to fake his own death. The abandoned workers, with the help of an eccentric creditor, form a cooperative. They have great success with Lange's stories about the cowboy, Arizona Jim, whose stories parallel the real-life experiences of the cooperative. At the same time, Lange and his neighbor Valentine, an old flame of Batala's, fall in love.

When Batala resurfaces, intending to reclaim the publishing company, Lange shoots and kills him to protect the cooperative. Lange and Valentine flee the country, stopping at an inn near the Belgian frontier where Valentine tells Lange's story to a group of the inn's patrons who had recognized Lange as the murderer on the run and threatened to alert the police. After hearing the story, the men sympathize with Lange and Valentine and allow them to escape across the border to freedom.

Cast

René Lefèvre — Amédée Lange
Florelle — Valentine Cardès
Jules Berry — Paul Batala
Marcel Lévesque — The concierge
Odette Talazac — The concierge's wife
Sylvia Bataille — Edith
Nadia Sibirskaïa — Estelle
Henri Guisol — The son Meunier
Maurice Baquet — Charles, the concierges' son
Jacques B. Brunius (as J.B. Brunius) — Mr. Baigneur
Sylvain Itkine — Inspector Juliani, Batala's cousin
Marcel Duhamel — Louis, the foreman
René Génin (as Génin) — A client at the Auberge Inn
Max Morise — Man with the pipe
Jean Dasté — The model maker
Paul Demange —Creditor

Production

Renoir considered the film a collaboration with the agitprop theatre company the October Group. It was based on an original idea by Renoir and Jean Castanier titled Sur la cour. Poet and screenwriter Jacques Prévert wrote the script. The shooting lasted 25 days from October to November 1935 and took place at Le Tréport and in the Paris studios of Billancourt. It was during the shooting of the film that Paul Éluard introduced Pablo Picasso to Dora Maar, who served as set photographer for the production.

Legacy

In his autobiography, Renoir claimed that the great success of The Crime of Monsieur Lange in France caused him to become strongly associated with the extreme political left wing. French communists asked him to produce overt propaganda films denouncing fascism, and he readily complied with the communists' demands, stating: "I believed that every honest man owed it to himself to resist Nazism. I am a filmmaker, and this is the only way in which I could play a part in the battle." Renoir's left-wing propaganda films of the mid-1930s, including The Crime of Monsieur Lange, along with his writings for various newspapers, placed him in danger when France entered World War II. Renoir's American friends, particularly the filmmaker Robert Flaherty, urged him to obtain a visa from the American consulate in Nice so that he may flee to the United States. He decided to do so after he claimed that Nazis had requested that he make films sympathetic to their cause.

Roger Leenhardt of Espirit called the film "all the more remarkable in that the work owes its witty style to the harmony of… two unshakably original temperaments… Prévert contributed his vivacity and mordant humor, and Renoir the resonance of his true romanticism." Peter Harcourt said that it was "in a sense the most intelligent film… Renoir ever made." François Truffaut wrote that "Mr. Lange is of all Renoir's films, the most spontaneous, the most dense set of miracles and camera, the busiest of truth and pure beauty, a film we would say touched by grace."

See also 
Cinema of France
List of French language films

References

Sources
Renoir, Jean. My Life and My Films, New York: Da Capo Press, 2000.

External links 
 
 The Crime of Monsieur Lange on Rotten Tomatoes

1936 films
1936 crime drama films
French satirical films
Films directed by Jean Renoir
French black-and-white films
1930s French-language films
Films with screenplays by Jacques Prévert
French crime drama films
Films scored by Joseph Kosma
1930s French films